Elysée Goba Zakpa (born 17 August 1992) is an Ivorian professional footballer who plays as a forward for Azerbaijan club Sabail.

References

Ivorian footballers
1992 births
Living people
Gondomar S.C. players
Santa Maria F.C. players
Gil Vicente F.C. players
F.C. Felgueiras 1932 players
Lusitânia F.C. players
Ethnikos Achna FC players
Sabail FK players
Ivorian expatriate footballers
Expatriate footballers in Portugal
Expatriate footballers in France
Expatriate footballers in Cyprus
Expatriate footballers in Azerbaijan
Ivorian expatriate sportspeople in Portugal
Ivorian expatriate sportspeople in France
Ivorian expatriate sportspeople in Cyprus
Ivorian expatriate sportspeople in Azerbaijan
Association football forwards